Jakarta International Expo, or JIExpo, is a convention, exhibition and entertainment complex located at Pademangan in North Jakarta, Indonesia. Opened in 2010, it was developed by the Central Cipta Murdaya group. Built in the area of the former Kemayoran Airport.  JIExpo recently underwent an expansion from 2016 to 2019, adding an international theatre and convention center.

JIExpo covers approximately 44 hectares, with a 2,500-seat theatre and concert hall, 100,000 square meters of exhibition and convention space, and supporting operations. The facility has five exhibition halls, two ballrooms, 14 meeting rooms, and a professional international theatre.  There is also a Holiday Inn Express on the grounds.

JIExpo Theatre
Completed and commissioned in 2019, the JIExpo Theatre is one of the largest and most advanced performing arts centers in Indonesia. The proscenium arch measures 11m by 30m, with a stage depth of 17m from set line to back wall.  The computerized fly system has 80 line sets onstage, and four over the forestage.  The orchestra pit can accommodate up to 50 musicians, and the backstage and dressing areas accommodate up to 106 performers.

One of the unique features of the theatre is its acoustic design.  The theatre interior is rated at STC 20, and is suitable for symphony and unamplified voice, as well as sound recording.  The theatre's opening event was a performance of Bach's Suites for Unaccompanied Cello by renowned cellist Yo-Yo Ma, in his first-ever performance in Indonesia.

The JIExpo Theatre features Meyer Leopard stacks and one of the largest Meyer Constellation systems in a performance venue anywhere in the world as of 2019, according to Meyer Sound.  The system has 285 speakers and 51 microphones installed throughout the interior, offering a superior audio experience for both acoustic and amplified performances.

JIExpo Convention Center
Located in the JIExpo Theatre complex is the JIExpo Convention Center.  The center is composed of two ballrooms, 12 configurable meeting rooms, and two executive-style Board Rooms.  The convention center and theatre lobbies are connected to a 5-star banquet kitchen that provides food and beverage service to all function areas.

The JIExpo Convention Center was also completed and commissioned in 2019.

JIExpo
JIExpo is a series of five exhibition halls surrounding a central outdoor tarmac. It hosts a number of exhibitions, concerts and other national and international events.  Annual events, such as Jakarta Fair, Java Jazz Festival, and Djakarta Warehouse Project draw thousands of visitors per year. The facility also hosts large-scale industrial, military and leisure exhibitions, as well as private and entertainment events.

Entertainment Events

See also

Kemayoran Airport
List of convention and exhibition centers

References

Concert halls in Indonesia
Buildings and structures in Jakarta
Convention centres in Indonesia
Fairs in Indonesia
Tourist attractions in Jakarta
Annual events in Indonesia
Venues of the 2018 Asian Games